The 1992 South Australian National Football League (SANFL) Grand Final saw the Port Adelaide Magpies defeat the Glenelg Tigers by 56 points. The match was played on Saturday 3 October 1992 at Football Park in wet weather in front of a crowd of 42,242.

This was Port Adelaide's 31st SANFL Premiership.  In the 24-year period of 1969–1992, Glenelg had appeared in 14 Grand Finals for only 3 Premiership victories (all over North Adelaide).  Of the 11 Grand Final defeats, 5 were at the hands of Port Adelaide.

Teams 
Port Adelaide was captained by Greg Phillips and coached by John Cahill.  Glenelg was captained by Scott Salisbury and coached by Kym Hodgeman.

For Port Adelaide, Nathan Buckley had 26 disposals (22 kicks, 4 handballs), followed by Bruce Abernethy and Rohan Smith with 25. Roger Delaney took 7 marks.

For Glenelg, Darren Mansell had 33 disposals (24 kicks, 9 handballs) and took 9 marks. Grant Reubenicht and Paul Hallahan had 23 disposals.  Reubenicht also took 9 marks.

Goal Kickers 

Port: S. Hodges 6.0, D. Smith 3.0, N. Buckley 2.2, A. Settre 1.0, R. Foster 1.0, B. Chalmers 1.0, D. Borlase 1.0, D. Brown 1.0, T. Ginever 1.0, S. Williams 0.1

Glenelg: J. Fidge 4.3, C. Lamb 1.2, D. Mansell 1.1, S. Salisbury 1.0, J. Seebohm 0.1

John Fidge's 4 goals took his season total to 84 goals, second on the SANFL goalkickers list for the 1992 season.

Port Adelaide player Mark Tylor had played at full forward for most of the season and was leading the SANFL goalkicking with 97 goals. Tylor broke his hand toward the end of the season, causing him to miss the finals. This not only denied Tylor the opportunity to play in the premiership, but also the chance to kick 100 goals for the season.

Richard Foster and Brett Chalmers both kicked goals just before half time, the latter from 70m. At half time it started to hail.

Umpires 
The game was umpired by Michael Abbott and Kevin Chambers.

Jack Oatey Medal
The Jack Oatey Medal for best player in the Grand Final was awarded to Nathan Buckley of Port Adelaide.  Buckley also won the Magarey Medal in 1992, and joined the Brisbane Bears in the Australian Football League (AFL) in 1993.

References

External links 
 Port Adelaide Magpies Official Website
 Glenelg Football Club Official Website
 SANFL Official Website

SANFL Grand Finals
Sanfl Grand Final, 1992